Ewington may refer to:

People
John Ewington (1936 –2015), British organist
Julie Ewington, specialist in contemporary art, chair of the board of the 4A Centre for Contemporary Asian Art, Sydney, Australia

Places
Ewington, Indiana
Ewington Township, Minnesota
Ewington, Ohio